Prosopeas is a genus of gastropods belonging to the family Achatinidae.

The species of this genus are found in Eastern Asia.

Species:

Prosopeas achates 
Prosopeas anceyi 
Prosopeas argentea 
Prosopeas carolinum 
Prosopeas cochliodes 
Prosopeas discernibile 
Prosopeas elberti 
Prosopeas elongatulum 
Prosopeas excellens 
Prosopeas fagoti 
Prosopeas hastatum 
Prosopeas haughtoni 
Prosopeas hebes 
Prosopeas henrici 
Prosopeas holosericum 
Prosopeas huberi 
Prosopeas lavillei 
Prosopeas laxispirum 
Prosopeas lombockense 
Prosopeas macilentum 
Prosopeas muongbuense 
Prosopeas pagoda 
Prosopeas pealei 
Prosopeas pfeifferi 
Prosopeas quadrasi 
Prosopeas rhodinaeforme 
Prosopeas roepstorfi 
Prosopeas romblonicum 
Prosopeas suturale 
Prosopeas turricula 
Prosopeas ventrosulum 
Prosopeas walkeri

References

Gastropods